Beverly Joan Nelson (née Dunn; July 2, 1929) is an American politician in the state of Iowa. Nelson was born in Clemons, Iowa. She attended the Mercy School of Nursing (Dubuque), University of Iowa (B.S.N.), and Iowa State University (M.S. and PhD). A Republican, she served in the Iowa House of Representatives from 1995 to 2001 (64th district).

References

1929 births
Living people
Republican Party members of the Iowa House of Representatives
Women state legislators in Iowa
People from Marshall County, Iowa
University of Iowa alumni
Iowa State University alumni
20th-century American politicians
20th-century American women politicians
21st-century American women